Erik Mattias Andersson (born 29 March 1978) is a retired Swedish handballer and currently a goalkeeper coach. He competed for the Swedish national team at the 2012 Summer Olympics in London where they won the silver medal.

Honours
Bundesliga:
: 2002, 2005, 2006, 2007, 2008, 2018
German Cup:
: 2007, 2008, 2015
German Super Cup:
: 2005, 2007, 2008
EHF Champions League:
: 2007, 2014
 EHF Cup Winner's Cup:
 : 2012
EHF Cup:
: 2002, 2004
EHF Champions Trophy:
: 2007

References

External links

1978 births
Living people
Swedish male handball players
Olympic handball players of Sweden
Handball players at the 2012 Summer Olympics
Handball players at the 2016 Summer Olympics
Sportspeople from Malmö
Olympic silver medalists for Sweden
Olympic medalists in handball
Medalists at the 2012 Summer Olympics
SG Flensburg-Handewitt players
THW Kiel players
Expatriate handball players
Handball-Bundesliga players
Swedish expatriate sportspeople in Germany
Swedish expatriate sportspeople in Spain
FC Barcelona Handbol players
Liga ASOBAL players
HK Drott players
Ystads IF players
Swedish handball coaches